Bukit Lumut Balai is a heavily eroded stratovolcano on Sumatra island, Indonesia. It consist of three eruption centers, two on the Bukit Lumut and one on the north-east side of the Bukit Balai. A large lava flow occurs on the north side of Bukit Balai. Active fumarole fields are found in two crescentic basins to the north of Bukit Lumut.

See also 

 List of volcanoes in Indonesia

References 

Volcanoes of Sumatra
Stratovolcanoes of Indonesia
Mountains of Indonesia